Several Canadian naval units have been named HMCS Ville de Quebec (meaning "Quebec City" in English).

  (I) was a Flower-class corvette that served in the Royal Canadian Navy during the Second World War.
  (II) is a  serving the Canadian Forces from 1993 to present.

Battle honours
 Atlantic, 1942–1944.
 Gulf of St. Lawrence, 1942.
 Mediterranean, 1943.
 English Channel, 1944–1945.

See also

References

 Directory of History and Heritage – HMCS Ville de Québec 

Royal Canadian Navy ship names